Playful Pluto (1934) is a Walt Disney cartoon, directed by Burt Gillett. It was the first cartoon to showcase Pluto as a major character. It was the 65th Mickey Mouse short film, and the third of that year.

Plot
While Mickey Mouse is working in his garden Pluto keeps bothering and interrupting him. After a while Pluto swallows a flashlight and gets stuck on a piece of flypaper.

Voice cast
 Mickey Mouse: Walt Disney
 Pluto: Pinto Colvig

Legacy
The cartoon is well known for a classic scene where Pluto gets stuck on a sticky piece of flypaper. This scene, animated by Norm Ferguson, has been described as vital in the history of character animation, because for the first time an animated character really seemed to think and have a mind of his own. The segment is also classic because it demonstrated how Disney artists were able to take a simple circumstance and build humor through a character.

Clips from the cartoon, including the flypaper scene, were used in the Preston Sturges film Sullivan's Travels (1941), in which the title character (Joel McCrea) has a revelation while viewing Playful Pluto alongside an audience of church-goers and chain-gang prisoners.

Home media
The short was released on December 7, 2004, on Walt Disney Treasures: Mickey Mouse in Black and White, Volume Two: 1929-1935.

See also
 Mickey Mouse (film series)

References

External links
 More Information at Disney Shorts

1934 films
1934 animated films
1930s Disney animated short films
1930s color films
Pluto (Disney) short films
Films directed by Burt Gillett
Films produced by Walt Disney
Films scored by Frank Churchill
American black-and-white films
1930s American films